Marcel Lentz (2 June 1929 – 9 April 2008) was a Luxembourgian sprint canoeist who competed from the late 1940s to the early 1960s. He was born in Luxembourg City. Competing in two Summer Olympics, he earned his best finish of 13th in the K-1 10000 m event at London in 1948.

References
Marcel Lentz's profile at Sports Reference.com

1929 births
2008 deaths
Sportspeople from Luxembourg City
Canoeists at the 1948 Summer Olympics
Canoeists at the 1960 Summer Olympics
Luxembourgian male canoeists
Olympic canoeists of Luxembourg